The Wairarapa Times-Age is the regional daily paper for New Zealand's Wairarapa where it is prepared, and published in Masterton. Though its roots are deep in Wairarapa's community, it joined a national combine in 2002 only to leave the combine in 2016, with its proprietors now entirely Wairarapa residents.

History
Of the first newspapers published in the region, the Wairarapa Mercury (later Standard), the Wairarapa News, the Wairarapa Register and the Newsletter, all, except the Newsletter were forced to close down by fires in 1937, 1872 and 1878 respectively. However the Wairarapa News began again six years after the fire on 30 October 1878. This paper merged with the Wairarapa Free Press on 11 September 1878 to form the Wairarapa Daily which became the Wairarapa Daily Times in 1892.

The Wairarapa Star was formed in 1881 and changed to the Wairarapa Age in 1902. These two papers, the Daily Times and the Age joined to form the Wairarapa Times-Age in 1938.

The newly merged paper moved to a purpose-built Art Deco-inspired building on the narrow corner of Chapel Street (SH 2) and Cole Street in Masterton. While the Times-Age still has its offices and production team based in its building, the  printing of the paper has now been outsourced. In 2006, the building was listed as a Category 2 historic place ("places of historical or cultural heritage significance or value") by the New Zealand Historic Places Trust (now Heritage New Zealand).

The paper was acquired by Wilson & Horton Newspaper group in July 2002. This group was in turn bought up by APN News & Media.

In May 2011 Wairarapa Times-Age, changed the format of its weekend edition and morning edition to a compact size, the Monday to Friday editions remained broadsheet afternoon publications. In November 2011 the newspaper changed all editions to compact sized, morning publications.

On 30 June 2016, NZME sold the Wairarapa Times-Age to Masterton-based National Media Ltd, returning the paper to local ownership.

Other publications
The Wairarapa Times-Age also publishes:

Wairarapa Midweek
This weekly community paper is delivered free to homes throughout the Wairarapa District.

Wairarapa Property
This weekly property magazine can be found at Real Estate offices and inserted into the Wairarapa Midweek which is delivered free to homes throughout the Wairarapa District.

References

External links

 Wairarapa Times-Age Website

Newspapers published in New Zealand
Mass media in Masterton
Publications established in 1878
New Zealand Media and Entertainment
1878 establishments in New Zealand